Vedivechankovil is a populated place in Thiruvananthapuram district, Kerala, India. It is situated on the Thiruvananthapuram-Neyyattinkara-Kanyakumari highway located about 13 km from the Trivandrum central railway station (Thampanoor).

"Vedi" means cracker. This place got the name from a famous temple situated near the highway where offerings are made in the form of bursting firecrackers. Most persons passing through this place will donate to the temple authorities to burst crackers for their well-being and progress. They believe that bursting crackers will save them from accidents and other unexpected negative incidents.

Infrastructure
Vedivechankovil Post Office
Rajeev Gandhi Swimming Pool 
Poomcode Temple
Vembannoor Mahadeva Temple
Bhoothamman temple popalarly known as vedivechankovil

References

Villages in Thiruvananthapuram district